Joseph Benedict Aquino Magsaysay, also known as JB Magsaysay (born July 6, 1980), is a Filipino actor, a politician, a businessman and was one of the 13 housemates of ABS-CBN's Pinoy Big Brother, Season 1. He was the second evicted housemate on his 35th day in Pinoy Big Brother's house.

Magsaysay was born in San Juan, La Union; he is a grand nephew of former Philippine president Ramon Magsaysay, and also the first cousin of the late Ram Revilla. He graduated with a college degree at the Philippine School of Business Administration in Quezon City. He entered politics for his hometown on May 14, 2007 local elections but he lost.

Career
After his second eviction from Big Brother house. JB was first TV guesting on ABS-CBN programs Nginiig, Ok Fine Whatever, Private Conversation with Boy Abunda, Y Speak, Star Magic Presents and others.

His cameo role as an antagonist in an action-packed TV series Palos with Cesar Montano and Jake Cuenca.

Then his first movie co-starrer with Bong Revilla Jr. in an action-adventure movie of the Metro Manila Film Festival 2009 Ang Panday.

Filmography

Television

Movies

References

1980 births
Living people
People from La Union
JB
Pinoy Big Brother contestants
21st-century Filipino male actors
Filipino male television actors
Filipino actor-politicians
Star Magic
Filipino male film actors